Chad Stevens (born June 23, 1974 in Lunenburg, Nova Scotia) is a Canadian curler from Chester, Nova Scotia. He skips on a rink on the World Curling Tour.

Stevens won the Curl Atlantic Championship in 2013 and 2014. He also won several provincial firefighter's championships, including 2001, 2009 and 2014.

On the World Curling Tour, Stevens has won one tour title, the 2013 Truro Cashspiel.

References

External links

Living people
1974 births
Curlers from Nova Scotia
People from Lunenburg County, Nova Scotia
Canadian male curlers